Toronto Centre is a federal electoral district in Toronto, Ontario, Canada, that has been represented in the House of Commons of Canada from 1872 to 1925, and since 1935, under the names Centre Toronto (1872–1903), Toronto Centre (1903–1925, and since 2004), Rosedale (1935–1997), and Toronto Centre—Rosedale (1997–2004).

Toronto Centre contains a large part of Downtown Toronto. The riding contains areas such as Regent Park (Canada's first social housing development), St. James Town (a largely immigrant area and the most densely populated neighbourhood in Canada), Cabbagetown, Church and Wellesley (a historic LGBTQ2 neighbourhood), Toronto Metropolitan University, the Toronto Eaton Centre and part of the city's financial district (the east side of Bay Street). At just under , it is the smallest riding in Canada by area.

History
Centre Toronto riding was first created in 1872 from portions of West Toronto and East Toronto.  In 1903, the name was changed to Toronto Centre.  In 1924, the riding was broken into Toronto East Centre, Toronto West Centre and Toronto South.

A riding covering much the same area was created in 1933 named "Rosedale" after the wealthy neighbourhood of Rosedale. This riding was replaced with "Toronto Centre—Rosedale" in 1996, but the quickly growing population resulted in large areas being shaved off on all sides.  In 2003, Toronto Centre—Rosedale was abolished, and a new riding somewhat to the east was created named "Toronto Centre".

Each of the four major national political parties (the Liberal Party, the Conservative Party, the Green Party, and the NDP), have active federal and provincial riding associations which act as the local party organizations in the riding.  Since the early 1990s, however, most contests have been between the Liberals and NDP.

This riding lost territory to University—Rosedale and Spadina—Fort York, and gained a small fraction of territory from Trinity—Spadina during the 2012 electoral redistribution. This made Toronto Centre the smallest size riding in the country, beating Papineau in Montreal by 4 km2.

Historically, the riding was one of the few in central Toronto where the Progressive Conservatives usually did well.  The PCs held the riding for 34 of the 58 years from 1935 to 1993. However, it has been in Liberal hands without interruption since 1993. The 2012 federal electoral redistribution shifted much of the wealthier northern part of the riding, which included Rosedale, to the new riding of University—Rosedale.

The riding was represented by former interim Liberal leader Bob Rae after the federal by-elections of March 17, 2008. Rae resigned from Parliament on July 31, 2013. Liberal Chrystia Freeland picked up the riding in the subsequent by-election, and held it until the 2015 Canadian federal election, when she chose to run for re-election in the new riding of University—Rosedale.

From 2015 to 2020, the riding was represented by Bill Morneau. On August 17, 2020, Morneau resigned as MP. Following a by-election on October 26, 2020, the riding has been represented by Marci Ien.

Former boundaries

Demographics
According to the Canada 2021 Census
Ethnic groups: 40.7% White, 13.8% South Asian, 12.3% Chinese, 10.3% Black, 5.0% Filipino, 3.3% Latin American, 2.4% Arab, 2.2% Korean, 2.2% Southeast Asian, 2.0% West Asian, 1.9% Indigenous
Languages: 51.2% English, 6.2% Mandarin, 3.0% Spanish, 2.7% Cantonese, 2.4% French, 2.3% Tagalog, 1.7% Arabic, 1.7% Korean, 1.6% Bengali, 1.4% Russian, 1.4% Hindi, 1.3% Portuguese, 1.2% Tamil, 1.1% Persian
Religions: 34.5% Christian (17.2% Catholic, 2.9% Christian Orthodox, 2.7% Anglican, 1.2% United Church, 10.5% Other), 10.2% Muslim, 6.1% Hindu, 1.9% Buddhist, 1.7% Jewish, 44.0% None
Median income: $40,800 (2020) 
Average income: $59,750 (2020)

Members of Parliament

These ridings have elected the following Members of Parliament:

Election results

Toronto Centre, 2004–present

^ Change is from 2011 redistributed results.

2008 general election

On September 21, 2008, Conservative candidate Chris Reid resigned because he said he couldn't commit to four years in government. However, blog entries were discovered that linked him to controversial musings on guns and the murder of Tim McLean aboard a Greyhound bus. Chris Reid was replaced by David Gentili as the Conservative candidate for Toronto Centre. Expenditures listed for Gentili include expenditures reported by Reid.

2008 by-election

A by-election, held on March 17, 2008, to fill a vacancy created by the resignation of Bill Graham was won by Liberal Bob Rae, a former Ontario NDP Premier.

The nominated Conservative candidate in the by-election, Mark Warner, was dropped by the party's national council on October 31, 2007. Don Meredith was nominated as the Conservative candidate in December 2007.

Activist El-Farouk Khaki ran for the NDP and Chris Tindal was the Green Party of Canada candidate. Liz White was the Animal Alliance Environmental Voters Party of Canada candidate, and Doug Plumb represented the Canadian Action Party.

|-

|align="left" colspan=2|Liberal hold
|align="right"|Swing
|align="right"| +8.5
|align="right"|

|-

|align="left" colspan=2|Liberal hold
|align="right"|Swing
|align="right"| -2.1
|align="right"|

Toronto Centre—Rosedale, 1996–2003

Note: Canadian Alliance vote is compared to the Reform vote in 1997 election.

Rosedale, 1933–1996

1933–1965

Note: NDP vote is compared to CCF vote in 1958 election.

Note: Progressive Conservative vote is compared to "National Government" vote in 1945 election.

Note: Progressive Conservative vote is compared to "National Government" vote in 1940 election.Note: "National Government" vote is compared to Conservative vote in 1935 election.Toronto Centre, 1903–1924Note: Conservative vote is compared to Unionist vote in 1917 election.Note: Unionist vote is compared to Liberal-Conservative vote in 1911 election.Note: vote compared to 1904 election.Centre Toronto, 1872–1903Note: vote compared to 1874 election.''

See also
 List of Canadian federal electoral districts
 Past Canadian electoral districts

References

External links
Riding history from the Library of Parliament:
1872-1924
1933-1996
1996-2003
2003-present
 Campaign expense data from Elections Canada

Federal electoral districts of Toronto
Ontario federal electoral districts
1933 establishments in Ontario
1872 establishments in Ontario
1924 disestablishments in Ontario
1996 disestablishments in Ontario
2003 establishments in Ontario